A list of people notable in the field of pathology.

A

 John Abercrombie, Scottish physician, neuropathologist and philosopher.
 Maude Abbott (1869–1940), Canadian pathologist, one of the earliest women graduated in medicine, expert in congenital heart diseases.
 Emile Achard (1860–1944), French internist and pathologist.
 A. Bernard Ackerman (1936–2008), American dermatopathologist & dermatologist
 Lauren Ackerman (1905–1993), American pathologist and one of the fathers of Surgical pathology.
 Theodor Ackermann (1825–1896), German pathologist.
 Albert Wojciech Adamkiewicz (1850–1921), Polish pathologist, (see Artery of Adamkiewicz).
 W. Stewart Alexander, contemporary British pathologist (see Alexander disease).
 Dame Ingrid Allen, Northern Irish neuropathologist.
 Friedrich August von Ammon (1799–1861), German ophthalmologist and pathologist.
 Gabriel Andral (1797–1876) French pathologist.
 Nikolay Anichkov (1885–1964), Russian pathologist.
 Julius Arnold (1835–1915), German pathologist.
 Ludwig Aschoff (1866–1942), German pathologist, discoverer of the Aschoff body and the Atrioventricular node in the heart.
 Max Askanazy (1865–1940), German pathologist (see Askanazy cell).
 E. Ask-Upmark, 20th-century Swedish pathologist (see Ask-Upmark kidney).

B

 Matthew Baillie (17611823), British physician and pathologist, credited with first identifying transposition of the great vessels and situs inversus.
 Heinrich von Bamberger (1822–1888), Austrian pathologist from Prague.
 Paul Clemens von Baumgarten (1848–1928), German pathologist.
 John Bruce Beckwith (born 1933), American pathologist (see Beckwith–Wiedemann syndrome).
 Antonio di Paolo Benivieni (14431502), Florentine physician who pioneered the use of the autopsy and many medical historians have considered him a founder of pathology.
 Franz Best (1878–1920), German pathologist (see Best's disease).
 Xavier Bichat (1771–1802), French anatomist and physiologist, remembered as father of modern histology and pathology.
 Max Bielschowsky (1869–1940), German neuropathologist & developer of histochemical stains.
 Edmund Biernacki (1866–1912), Polish pathologist  (see Biernacki Reaction).
 Felix Victor Birch-Hirschfeld (1842–1899), German pathologist.
 Giulio Bizzozero (1846–1901), Italian doctor and medical researcher.
 Otto Bollinger (1843–1909), German pathologist.
 Charles-Joseph Bouchard (1837–1915), French pathologist.
 William Boyd (1885–1979), Scottish-Canadian  physician, pathologist, academic and author of several 20th-century textbooks on general and surgical pathology.
 Erich Franz Eugen Bracht (1882–1969), German pathologist and gynaecologist.
 Fritz Brenner (1877–1969), German pathologist (see Brenner tumor).
 Alexander Breslow (1928–1980), American pathologist (see Breslow's depth).
 Richard Bright (1789–1858), British internist and pathologist (see Bright's disease).
 Ludwig von Buhl (1816–1880), German pathologist.

C

 Santiago Ramón y Cajal (1852–1934), Spanish pathologist and Nobel laureate in Physiology or Medicine 1906
 Francis Camps (1905–1972), English forensic pathologist.
 Myrtelle Canavan (1879–1953), American physician, medical researcher, and one of the first female pathologists (see Canavan disease).
 Karl Friedrich Canstatt (1807–1850), German physician, pathologist, and medical author.
 Marie Cassidy (born 1959), Irish forensic pathologist.
 Benjamin Castleman (1906–1982), American surgical pathologist and eponymist of Castleman's disease.
 Hans Chiari (1851–1916), Austrian pathologist (see Arnold–Chiari malformation, Budd–Chiari syndrome).
 Jacob Churg (1910–2005), Russian-born American pathologist (see Churg–Strauss syndrome).
 Giuseppe Vincenzo Ciaccio (1824–1901), Italian anatomist and histologist.
 Julius Friedrich Cohnheim (1839–1884), German pathologist known for his research on the mechanism of inflammation and the study of circulation.
 Albert Coons (1912–1978), American physician, immunologist, & immunopathologist.
 Astley Cooper (1768–1841), English surgeon, anatomist & pathologist.
 Victor André Cornil (1837–1908), French pathologist and histologist.
 Dominic Corrigan (1802–1880), Irish physician & pathologist (see Corrigan's pulse).
 Ramzi Cotran, American pathologist
 William Thomas Councilman (1854–1933), American pathologist (see Councilman body).
 Jean Cruveilhier (1791–1874), French anatomist and pathologist (see Cruveilhier's sign, Cruveilhier–Baumgarten disease).

D

 David C. Dahlin (1917–2003) American surgical & orthopedic pathologist.
 Jean Baptiste Hippolyte Dance (1797–1832) French pathologist.
 Ferdinand-Jean Darier (1856–1938), French pathologist and dermatologist.
 James R. Dawson (1908–1986), American pathologist (see Dawson encephalitis).
 Francis Delafield (1841–1915), American physician & pathologist.
 Franz Dittrich (1815–1859), Austrian-Bohemian-German pathologist.
 Karl Gottfried Paul Döhle (1855–1928), German pathologist & histologist (see Döhle bodies). 
 William L. Donohue (1906–1985), Canadian pathologist (see Donohue syndrome).
 Georges Dreyer (1873–1934), Danish pathologist, professor of pathology at Oxford University.
 I. N. Dubin (born 1913), American pathologist (see Dubin–Johnson syndrome).
 Cuthbert Dukes (1890–1977), English physician and pathologist for whom the Dukes classification for colorectal cancer is named.
 Guillaume Dupuytren (1777–1835), French military surgeon & surgical pathologist.

E

 Karl Joseph Eberth (1835–1926), German pathologist and bacteriologist.
 William E. Ehrich (1900–1967), German-American pathologist, professor of pathology at Philadelphia General Hospital and the Graduate School of Medicine of the University of Pennsylvania.
 Paul Ehrlich (1854–1915), German physician, researcher and pathologist, Nobel laureate, one of the founders of immunology & laboratory medicine.
 Jakob Erdheim (1874–1937), Austrian pathologist (see Erdheim–Chester disease).
 James Ewing (1866–1943), American surgical pathologist, first professor of pathology at Cornell University, eponymist of Ewing's sarcoma, one of the founders of AACR.

F

 Robert (Robin) Sanno Fåhræus (1888–1968), Swedish pathologist (see Fåhræus effect and Fåhræus–Lindqvist effect).
 Sidney Farber (1903–1973), American pediatric pathologist, regarded as the father of modern chemotherapy, and after whom the Dana–Farber Cancer Institute is named.
 Martin J. Fettman (born 1956), American veterinarian, veterinary pathologist, and astronaut
 Johannes Andreas Grib Fibiger (1867–1928), Danish physician & pathologist, Nobel laureate in Physiology or Medicine 1926.
 Paul Flechsig (1847–1929), German neuroanatomist, psychiatrist and neuropathologist.
 Christopher D. M. Fletcher, Anglo-American pathologist
 Friedrich Theodor von Frerichs (1819–1885), German pathologist.
 Nikolaus Friedreich (1825–1882), German pathologist and neurologist.
 August von Froriep (1849–1917), German anatomist.
 Robert Froriep (1804–1861), German anatomist and medical publisher.

G

 Carl Jakob Adolf Christian Gerhardt (1833–1902), German pathologist
 Joseph von Gerlach (1820–1896), German professor of anatomy, pioneer of histological staining and micrography
 Gustav Giemsa (1867–1948), German physician, pathologist, & histochemist (see Giemsa stain)
 Anthony Gill  (born 1972), Australian pathologist and medical researcher
 Camillo Golgi (1843–1926), Italian neuropathologist & Nobel laureate in Physiology or Medicine, 1906
 Ernest Goodpasture (1886–1960), American pathologist, eponymist of Goodpasture's syndrome
 Austin Gresham (1925–2009), English forensic pathologist

H

 Hakaru Hashimoto (1881–1934), Japanese medical scientist.
 Ludvig Hektoen (1863–1951), American researcher on pathology of infectious diseases.
 Arnold Ludwig Gotthilf Heller (1840–1913), German anatomist and pathologist.
 Friedrich Gustav Jakob Henle (1809–1885), German physician, pathologist and anatomist.
 Richard L. Heschl (1824–1881), Austrian anatomist & pathologist.
 Thomas Hodgkin (1798–1866), English physician & pathologist; eponymist of Hodgkin's disease.
 Friedrich Albin Hoffmann (1843–1924), German internist and pathologist.
 Jason Hornick, American pathologist and researcher
 Karl Hürthle (1860–1945), German physiologist and histologist.
 Helen Hart (1900–1971), American plant pathologist

J

 Elaine Jaffe, American pathologist, expert in research, diagnostics and classification of lymphomas, particularly follicular lymphoma.

K

 Fujiro Katsurada (1867–1946), Japanese pathologist.
 Eduard Kaufmann (1860–1931), German  pathologist.
 Ernest Kennaway (1881–1958), English clinical chemist and researcher on carcinogenesis.
 Jack Kevorkian (1928–2011), American pathologist, controversial advocate of euthanasia.
 Theodor Albrecht Edwin Klebs (1834–1913), German-Swiss pathologist.
 Julius von Kossa 19th-century Austro-Hungarian pathologist (see Von Kossa stain).
 Leiv Kreyberg (1896–1984), Norwegian war hero, humanitarian and pathologist known for typology of lung cancer.
 Hans Kundrat (1845–1893), Austrian pathologist.
 Kathleen Coard (born 1952), Grenadian pathologist.

L

 Paul Eston Lacy (1924–2005), former chairperson of pathology at Washington University and diabetes researcher.
 Paul Langerhans (1847–1888), German pathologist, physiologist and biologist.
 William Boog Leishman (1865–1926), English authority on the pathology of human parasitic diseases (see leishmaniasis)
 George Lignac (1891–1954), Dutch pathologist-anatomist.
 Henrique da Rocha Lima (1879–1956), Brazilian physician, pathologist and infectologist
 James Linder (born 1954), American cytopathologist and technological developer
 Leo Loeb (1869–1959), American pathologist and early cancer researcher.

M

 Frank Burr Mallory (1862–1941), American surgical pathologist & histochemist (see Mallory bodies)
 Rod Markin (born 1956) American pioneer in laboratory automation.
 Alexander A. Maximow (1874–1928), Russian-American scientist, histologist and embryologist.
 John McCrae (1872–1918), Canadian pathologist, physician, soldier and poet, author of [In Flanders Fields].
 Frances Gertrude McGill (1882–1959), pioneering Canadian pathologist and criminologist
 Tracey McNamara, veterinary pathologist at the Bronx Zoo who played a pivotal role in identifying the first outbreak of West Nile Virus in the United States
 Giovanni Battista Morgagni (1682–1771), Italian pathologist, considered the father of modern Anatomical Pathology

N

 Heijiro Nakayama (1871–1956), Japanese pathologist.
 Bernhard Naunyn (1839–1925), German pathologist.
 Franz Ernst Christian Neumann (1834–1918), German pathologist.
 Thomas Noguchi (born 1927), Japanese American forensic pathologist & medical examiner.

O

 Shuji Ogino (born 1968), Japanese pathologist, epidemiologist, Harvard University professor, and pioneer in molecular pathological epidemiology. 
 Eugene Lindsay Opie (1873–1971), American pathologist and researcher on tuberculosis.
 Johannes Orth (1847–1923), German pathologist.
 William Osler (1849–1919), Canadian physician and pathologist, founder professor at Johns Hopkins Hospital.

P

 Richard Paltauf (1858–1924), Austrian pathologist and bacteriologist.
 George Nicolas Papanicolaou (1883–1962), Greek-American cytopathologist & developer of the Papanicolaou cervical smear (see Pap smear)
 Artur Pappenheim (1870–1916), German physician, developer of histochemical stains.
 Lukáš Plank (born 1951), Slovak pathologist specializing in oncopathology and hematopathology.
 Emil Ponfick (1844–1913), German pathologist.

R

 Louis-Antoine Ranvier (1835–1922), French physician, pathologist, anatomist and histologist, discoverer of nodes of Ranvier.
 Ronald Rapini (1948–present), US dermatopathologist.  discoverer of sclerotic fibroma.
 Friedrich Daniel von Recklinghausen (1833–1910), German pathologist.
 Benno Reinhardt (1819–1852), German physician, specialized in the field of pathological anatomy.
 Donald Rix (1931–2009), founder of a Canadian commercial pathology laboratory
 Carl von Rokitansky (1804–1878), Bohemian autopsy pathologist 
 Juan Rosai (1940-2020), Italian-American surgical pathologist, discoverer of Rosai-Dorfman disease and the desmoplastic small round cell tumor.
 Gustave Roussy (1874–1948), Swiss-French neuropathologist.

S

 Christian Georg Schmorl (1861–1932), German pathologist.
 Richard Scolyer, Australian pathologist
 Johann Lukas Schönlein (1793–1864), German naturalist, and pathologist.
 Charles Scott Sherrington (1857–1952), English neuropathologist & Nobel laureate in Physiology or Medicine 1932
 Richard Shope (1901–1966), American virologist and pathologist.
 Keith Simpson (1907–1985), English forensic pathologist.
 Lee J. Slavutin (born 1951), Australian pathologist.
 Maud Slye (1879–1954), American experimental pathologist.
 Theobald Smith (1859–1934), American pioneering epidemiologist and pathologist.
 Kim Solez (born 1946), American pathologist, father of the Banff Classification of Transplantation Pathology.
 Sir Bernard Spilsbury (1877–1947), British pathologist.
 Sophie Spitz (1910–1956), American surgical pathologist, eponymist of Spitz nevus
 Edward Stafne (born 1894, date of death unknown), American oral pathologist (see Stafne defect).
 Allen Starry (1890–1973), American pathologist (see Warthin–Starry stain).
 Javier Arias Stella (1924–2020), Peruvian pathologist, describer of the Arias Stella reaction in the endometrium.
 Stephen Sternberg (1920–2021), American pathologist, founding Editor-in-Chief of The American Journal of Surgical Pathology and editor of several 20th-century pathology textbooks.
 Arthur Purdy Stout (1885–1967). American surgeon and pathologist, & one of the fathers of modern Surgical pathology.
 Lotte Strauss (1913–1985), American pathologist (see Churg–Strauss syndrome).

T

 Sunao Tawara (1873–1952), Japanese pathologist, discoverer of the Atrioventricular node.
 Donald Teare (1911–1979), British pathologist.
 Jacques-René Tenon (1724–1816), French surgeon and pathologist. 
 Ludwig Traube (1818–1876), German physician, co-founder of the experimental pathology in Germany.
 Václav Treitz (1819–1872), Czech pathologist.
 Charles Emile Troisier (1844–1919), French doctor.

U

 Johann Paul Uhle (1827–1861), German physician and pathologist.
 Paul Gerson Unna (1850–1929), one of the founders of dermatopathology.
 James Underwood (1942–), British pathologist.

V

 José Verocay (1876–1927), Czechoslovakian pathologist (see Verocay body).
 Rudolf Virchow (1821–1902), German physician, politician, & the father of "cellular" pathology.
 Adolf Vossius (1855–1925), German pathologist (see Vossius ring).

W

 Erik Waaler (1903–1997), Norwegian professor of medicine.
 Hermann Julius Gustav Wächter (born 1878, date of death unknown), German physician (see Bracht-Wachter bodies).
 Ernst Leberecht Wagner (1829–1888), German pathologist.
 Heinrich von Waldeyer-Hartz (1836–1921), German anatomist.
 Robin Warren (born 1937), Australian gastrointestinal pathologist & Nobel laureate in Physiology or Medicine, 2005.
 Aldred Scott Warthin (1866–1931), American pathologist (see Warthin–Starry stain).
 David Weatherall (1933–2013), British physician and researcher
 Friedrich Wegener (1907–1990), German pathologist (see granulomatosis with polyangiitis).
 Anton Weichselbaum (1845–1920), Austrian pathologist and bacteriologist.
 Carl Weigert (1845–1904), developer of histochemical stains.
 Adolf Weil (1848–1916), German physician and pathologist (see Weil's disease).
 Ronald S. Weinstein (1938–2021), American pathologist, inventor, educator (see Telepathology).
 Sharon Weiss (born 1945), American surgical pathologist, expert on soft tissue pathology (see Sarcoma).
 William Henry Welch (1850–1934), American physician, pathologist, bacteriologist, medical school administrator, founder professor at Johns Hopkins Hospital.
 Max Westenhöfer, (1871–1957), German pathologist, disciple of Rudolf Virchow, author of the aquatic ape hypothesis and influential on the development of pathology and social medicine in Chile.
 George Whipple (1878–1976), American physician, pathologist, biomedical researcher, and medical school educator and administrator, Nobel laureate in Physiology or Medicine, 1934.
 James Homer Wright (1869–1928), surgical pathologist and developer of histochemical stains (see Wright stain).

 Guy Alfred Wyon (1883–1924), English pathologist, one of the team which resolved the issue of potentially-fatal TNT poisoning in shell factories during World War I

Y

 Yamagiwa Katsusaburō (1863–1930) Japanese pathologist, developed the concept of chemical carcinogenesis.

Z

 Friedrich Wilhelm Zahn (1845–1904), German pathologist.
 Friedrich Albert von Zenker (1825–1898), German pathologist and physician.
 Hugo Wilhelm von Ziemssen (1829–1902), German pathologist and physician.

See also 

 Lists of people by occupation

Pathologists
Pathologists